The first line crossing Belarus was the Saint Petersburg–Warsaw Railway, which started operating in late 1862. This included section and railway station in Grodno. During the mid 1860s, a railway line was also built from Daugavpils to Polatsk and further to Vitebsk. The Warsaw–Brest Railway, opened in 1866; completed to Moscow in 1871.

The Libau–Romny Railway was built in 1871-1874. It passed through Belarus.

See also
Rail transport in Belarus
Belorusskaja Železnaja Doroga

References

History
Belarus
Rail